The 2009 Old Dominion Monarchs football team represented Old Dominion University during the 2009 NCAA Division I FCS football season. The team compiled a 9–2 record, in the first season under the guidance of head coach Bobby Wilder. The Monarchs competed as an independent.  The team's home games were played at Foreman Field.

Preseason notes
Season tickets for the Monarchs' inaugural 2009 season more than sold out and the school had to refund 1,065 orders.

Schedule

Coaches and support staff

Game summaries

Chowan
September 5, 2009 was a new start, and proved to be the perfect ending. Old Dominion played its first football game in 69 years against a Division II school from North Carolina, the Chowan Hawks, in front of a sold-out 19,782 fans. Old Dominion won 36–21. The defensive line dominated Chowan's offensive line and ODU's defense forced 5 turnovers. ODU quarterback, Thomas DeMarco, hooked up with wide receiver Marquel Thomas for a 50-yard pass play that marked the first touchdown for ODU in 69 years. DeMarco ended the game going 11 for 20 for 123 yards, 6 of those completions were to Reid Evans, who finished the game with 93 yards receiving.

Edmon McClam set a new FCS record with three blocked XP attempts in one game.

Virginia Union

On September 12, 2009 ODU hosted the Division II Virginia Union Panthers and won in front of another sellout crowd, 49–17.

ODU's defense only gave up 237 yards of total offense, and gained 443 yards themselves. ODU forced 4 turnovers, and quickly jumped out to a 21–0 lead in the 2nd quarter due to an unexpected onside kick. By halftime ODU was winning 35–10 and quarterback Thomas DeMarco had already scored 4 touchdowns, 2 in the air and 2 on the ground. DeMarco finished with 198 yards passing and 39 yards rushing. Running back Mario Crawford led the game with 71 yards rushing and wide receiver Dorian Jackson led the game with 79 yards receiving.

Jacksonville

September 19, 2009 marked ODU's first road game. It was ODUs first Division I-AA opponent, and was ODU's first come-from-behind win. ODU traveled to Florida to face the Jacksonville Dolphins. ODU won 28–27.

Jacksonville was the first opponent that was supposed to be a challenge. Coming off two easy wins against smaller opponents, this was ODU's first test. Trailing 20–7 at halftime, ODU opened the 2nd half with a quick score by Mario Crawford and headed into the 4th quarter trailing 20–14. After trading touchdowns early in the 4th quarter, ODU received the ball with just over 1:30 left in the game. Thomas DeMarco quickly marched his team down the field and found Dorian Jackson for a 32-yard touchdown pass with only 45 seconds remaining in the game.

Thomas DeMarco finished with 175 yards passing and 136 yards rushing. Reid Evans had 7 receptions for 86 yards, and the ODU defense forced 4 turnovers.

Monmouth

September 26, 2009 was the day of ODU's new football team's first loss. The loss came at the hands of the Monmouth Hawks, in front of another sold-out ODU crowd, 31–28. ODU did not have an answer for Monmouth's running back David Sinisi who ran the ball 41 times for 216 yards, and also threw a 24-yard touchdown pass on a halfback option play. Sinisi ran for 2 first-downs on Monmouth's final possession of the game when ODU was trying to force a punt, in hopes of possibly winning the game. Because of that Monmouth ended the game with possession. Thomas DeMarco passed for a season high 215 yards while running for 42 more. ODU only forced 2 turnovers while averaging 4.3 takeaways a game coming into this game. Time of possession was very lopsided, with ODU's TOP being 20:49 and Monmouth's being 39:11.

Fordham

On October 3, 2009 the Monarchs suffered the second loss of the 2009 season. The Monarchs traveled to The Bronx to face off against the Fordham University Rams and future NFL draft pick John Skelton. On the wet and muggy day, the Rams managed to outperform the Old Dominion Monarchs as Skelton threw for two touchdowns and  402 yards. Down 25–7 at halftime, the Monarchs took advantage of Fordham turnovers. Old Dominion quarterback Thomas DeMarco threw for 240 yards and 3 touchdowns. After a two-point conversion play and a Carlos Davis touchdown, the Monarchs took a 29–28 lead with just under 7 minutes left in the game. The Rams regained possession with very little time left and managed to score on the pursuing drive to lead 34–29. On Old Dominion's last possession, with under a minute left, Fordham's Bryson Wilson recovered a Thomas DeMarco fumble at midfield to seal the Fordham victory, 34–29.

Presbyterian

Campbell

Savannah State

ODU quarterback Thomas DeMarco threw for 198 yards (14-of-20 passing) and three touchdowns without an interception as the Monarchs defeated fellow FCS Independent Savannah State 38–17 in Savannah, Georgia.

ODU improved to 6–2 while Savannah State (1–6) saw its losing streak extended to six games.

Georgetown

North Carolina Central

VMI

References

Old Dominion
Old Dominion Monarchs football seasons
Old Dominion Monarchs football